Black Pete could refer to one of the following characters in fiction:
Zwarte Piet, a character in folklore of Sinterklaas, in the Low Countries and parts of the Dutch Caribbean
Pete (Disney), a Disney character and nemesis of Mickey Mouse

pl:Czarny Piotruś